Christopher Beech (born 5 November 1975) is an English former professional footballer.

Beech began his career at Manchester City but failed to make a first team appearance at the Maine Road club. He joined Cardiff City on a free transfer in August 1997 and was first team regular during the 1997–98 season, playing in every league game of the season. However, Beech was one of eleven players released by the club, moving to Rotherham United the following summer and remained with the club until 2002 when he joined Doncaster Rovers of the Conference National. Signed as a replacement for Kevin Sandwith, was part of the club's squad as they won promotion back to the English Football League and remained on their books the following season. He was released at the end of the 2003–04 season to join Carlisle United.

References

External links

1975 births
Living people
English footballers
Manchester City F.C. players
Cardiff City F.C. players
Rotherham United F.C. players
Doncaster Rovers F.C. players
Carlisle United F.C. players
People from Congleton
Sportspeople from Cheshire
English Football League players
Association football fullbacks